Baradzanwa  is a ward in Bikita District of Masvingo Province in south-eastern Zimbabwe.

Wards of Zimbabwe
Bikita District
Populated places in Masvingo Province